= Lisa Alisa =

Artist based in New York City

Lisa Alisa is an artist based in New York City.

She is known for provocative graphic images of young women that bear a strong self-portrait resemblance. Lisa Alisa's work addresses issues of independence, femininity, youth, environment and natural conservation.

She has been published and exhibited worldwide.

== Exhibitions ==
2013

- EGOIST first capsule collection of top wear for men and women

2012

- “My Little Pony Project”, group exhibition. Los Angeles, New York, USA
- 300 Jahre Friedrich der Grosse, Konigliche Porzellan-Manufaktur Berlin. Berlin, Germany
- "Cage in Search of a Bird" project, Mercedes Benz Fashion Week Berlin. Berlin, Germany
- Solo show - Graphite. May 2011
- Graphite for Japan Silent Auction. March 31, 2011
- SWEET STREETS fundraiser: Japan LA 7320 1/2 Melrose Ave. Los Angeles, CA 90046 March 19, 2011
- Collaboration Project with Yuki Itoda for Moscow Museum of Modern Arts. 2nd Moscow Biennale for Young Art. July 2010
- October 24, 2008 - Ad Hoc Art Gallery, Brooklyn, NY, USA
- May 18, 2008 - Design Festa, Tokyo, Japan
- April 12, 2008 - Project Gallery, Los Angeles, CA, USA
- February 16, 2008 - Apama Mackey Gallery, Houston, TX, USA
- February 8, 2008 - Ad Hoc Art Gallery, Brooklyn, NY, USA
- 28 June 2007 - July 14 at The Tower Music Festival, London, UK
